Essex is a county in the east of England. In the early Anglo-Saxon period it was the Kingdom of the East Saxons, but it gradually came under the control of more powerful kingdoms, and in the ninth century it became part of Wessex. The modern county is bounded by Suffolk and Cambridgeshire to the north, Hertfordshire to the west, Greater London to the south-west, Kent across the River Thames to the south, and the North Sea to the east. At the top level of local government are Essex County Council and two unitary authorities, Southend-on-Sea and Thurrock. Under the county council, there are twelve district and borough councils.

In England, Sites of Special Scientific Interest (SSSIs) are designated by Natural England, which is responsible for protecting England's natural environment. Designation as an SSSI gives legal protection to the most important wildlife and geological sites. As of August 2016, there are 86 sites designated in Essex. There are 19 sites with a purely geological interest, and 64 listed for biological interest. A further three sites are designated for both reasons.

The largest is Foulness, which is internationally important for wildfowl and waders, and has 71 nationally rare invertebrate species. The smallest is Holland-on-Sea Cliff, a geological site which throws light on the course of the River Thames before it was diverted south by the Anglian glaciation around 450,000 years ago. Hangman's Wood and Deneholes has deneholes, shafts created by medieval chalk mining which are now used by hibernating bats. Lion Pit is the site of flint-knapping by Neanderthals around 200,000 years ago, and it has been possible to fit back together some of the flint flakes.

Key

Interest

B = site of biological interest
G = site of geological interest

Public access
FP = access to footpaths through the site only
NO = no public access to site
PP = public access to part of site
YES = public access to site

Other classifications
BSO = Bird Sanctuary Order
Buglife = Buglife – The Invertebrate Conservation Trust
DVAONB = Dedham Vale Area of Outstanding Natural Beauty

EWT = Essex Wildlife Trust
GCR = Geological Conservation Review
HMWT = Herts and Middlesex Wildlife Trust
LNR = Local Nature Reserve
NCR = Nature Conservation Review site
NNR = National Nature Reserve
NT = National Trust
Ramsar = Ramsar site
RSPB = Royal Society for the Protection of Birds
SAC = Special Area of Conservation
SAONB = Suffolk Coast and Heaths Area of Outstanding Natural Beauty
SM = Scheduled Monument
SPA = Special Protection Area

Sites

See also
List of Local Nature Reserves in Essex
Essex Wildlife Trust

Notes

References

 
Essex
Sites of Special Scientific Interest
Geology of East of England